Painting Pictures is the debut studio album by American rapper Kodak Black. It was released on March 31, 2017, by Dollaz N Dealz Entertainment, Sniper Gang and Atlantic Records. Recording sessions took place from 2016 to 2017, at the Pink House Studios in Miami, Florida, with production provided by Metro Boomin, Southside and Mike Will Made It; as well as guest appearances from Future, Young Thug, Bun B and Jeezy, among others.

The album was supported by three singles: "There He Go", "Tunnel Vision", and "Patty Cake".

Singles
The album's lead single, "There He Go", was released on December 23, 2016, as a celebration of his release from jail. The song was produced by Dubba-AA and DJ Swift.

The album's second single, "Tunnel Vision", was released on February 17, 2017. The song was produced by Metro Boomin, Southside and Cubeatz. The song debuted at number 27, and then later peaked at number six, becoming Kodak's first top 10 hit on the US Billboard Hot 100, and at number 17 on the Canadian Hot 100.

The third single off the album, "Patty Cake", was released on August 4, 2017. After the music video for the song was released, the song peaked at 76 on the US Billboard Hot 100.

Commercial performance
Painting Pictures debuted at number three on the US Billboard 200, with 71,000 album-equivalent units, of which 51,000 were streaming units and 15,000 were pure album sales in the first week. In its second week the album dropped to number eight on the chart with 39,000 album-equivalent units. On November 13, 2019, the album was certified platinum by the Recording Industry Association of America (RIAA) for combined sales and album-equivalent units of over a million units in the United States.

Track listing
Credits adapted from Tidal.

Notes
  signifies a co-producer
 The original version of "Patty Cake" contained samples from "Assault" from the Final Fantasy X: Piano Collections soundtrack composed by Nobuo Uematsu

Charts

Weekly charts

Year-end charts

Certifications

References

2017 debut albums
Atlantic Records albums
Albums produced by Metro Boomin
Albums produced by Southside (record producer)
Albums produced by Mike Will Made It
Albums produced by Nav (rapper)
Albums produced by Honorable C.N.O.T.E.
Albums produced by Cubeatz
Kodak Black albums